Darreh Geru-ye Sofla (also Romanized as Darreh Gerū-ye Soflá; also known as Darreh Gerow-ye Pā’īn, Darreh Gerūh Pā’īn, Darreh Gerū-ye Pā’īn, and Darreh Gorūh Soflá) is a village in Bahmayi-ye Sarhadi-ye Sharqi Rural District, Dishmok District, Kohgiluyeh County, Kohgiluyeh and Boyer-Ahmad Province, Iran. At the 2006 census, its population was 408, in 80 families.

References 

Populated places in Kohgiluyeh County